Les Fermières Obsédées (F.O., "Obsessed Farm Wives") is a contemporary Québécois feminist visual art performance ensemble founded by Annie Baillargeon and Eugénie Cliche in 2001. The name refers to a feminist organization, Cercles des fermières, in Quebec.

References 

Performance artist collectives
Canadian artist groups and collectives
2001 establishments in Quebec